Mark Harwood (born 8 April 1978) is a former Australian rules footballer who played with Port Adelaide in the Australian Football League (AFL).

Harwood was the third player selected by Port Adelaide in the 1996 National Draft and ninth overall. The Tasmanian recruit didn't feature at all in the 1997 AFL season, but played six games in 1998, 13 in 1999, nine in 2000 and two games in 2001 as injuries curtailed his career.

In the South Australian National Football League (SANFL), Harwood played for three clubs during his career; South Adelaide, Glenelg and the Port Adelaide Magpies.

References

External links
 
 

1978 births
Australian rules footballers from Tasmania
Port Adelaide Football Club players
Port Adelaide Football Club players (all competitions)
Port Adelaide Magpies players
South Adelaide Football Club players
Glenelg Football Club players
Tassie Mariners players
Living people